Arcuate artery can refer to:
 Arcuate artery of the foot
 Arcuate arteries of the kidney
 Arcuate vessels of uterus